Joseph F. Kilkenny is a Navy Rear Admiral who was commander of U.S. Navy Carrier Strike Group 10 and Naval Education and Training Command. Kilkenny graduated from the Citadel in 1977.

References

External links
C-SPAN

Living people
United States Navy admirals
Year of birth missing (living people)